Hà Tĩnh is a city in Vietnam. It is the capital of Hà Tĩnh Province, and lies in the North Central Coast region. It is located on National Highway 1A. The Vietnamese capital Hanoi is located 340 km north of Hà Tĩnh, Vinh is located 50 km to the north, and Huế is located 314 km to the south. Hà Tĩnh is 12.5 km from the East Sea.

Geography
 North borders: Thạch Hà town (via Cày bridge), Cửa Sót river.
 West borders: Thạch Đài Commune, Cày river (Thạch Hà district).
 Southern borders: Cẩm Bình Commune, Cẩm Vịnh Commune (Cẩm Xuyên district).
 Eastern borders: Đồng Môn river (Thạch Hà district, Lộc Hà)

Administrative divisions
Hà Tĩnh city consists of 16 administration units: 10 wards and 6 communes:
 Nam Hà ward
 Bắc Hà ward
 Tân Giang ward
 Trần Phú ward
 Nguyễn Du ward
 Hà Huy Tập ward
 Đại Nài ward
 Văn Yên ward
 Thạch Linh ward
 Thạch Quý ward
 Thạch Bình commune
 Thạch Trung commune
 Thạch Môn commune
 Thạch Hạ commune
 Thạch Hưng commune
 Thạch Đồng commune

Education
There are many tertiary education institutions such as Hà Tĩnh University, Hà Tĩnh College of Medicine, Nguyễn Du Cultural, Sports and Tourism College, Hà Tĩnh Vocational College of Technology and Vietnam-Germany College of Vocation. Some high schools include Hà Tĩnh Senior High School, Phan Đình Phùng High School and Thành Sen (Lotus City) High School.

Climate
Hà Tĩnh has a marginal and unusually wet humid subtropical climate (Köppen Cfa) bordering on both a tropical monsoon climate (Am) and a trade-wind tropical rainforest climate (Af) – the last of these being a rare climate type in Vietnam. The heaviest rain is in the northeast monsoon season from September to November, when  can be expected, but rainfall exceeds  even in the driest months of the “spring” season. The weather during the “winter” season from December to February is warm, humid and somewhat rainy, whilst the “summer” from May to August is hot to sweltering although drier than most of Indochina due to the influence of the mountains to the southwest.

Gallery

See also 
 Formosa Ha Tinh Steel

References 

Provincial capitals in Vietnam
Populated places in Hà Tĩnh province
Districts of Hà Tĩnh province
Cities in Vietnam